Polk Township is the name of some places in the U.S. state of Pennsylvania:

Polk Township, Jefferson County, Pennsylvania
Polk Township, Monroe County, Pennsylvania

Pennsylvania township disambiguation pages